Plan 9 Records, originally known as Blank Records, was an independent record label that was founded in 1977 by Glenn Danzig of the horror punk band The Misfits. The label was discontinued in 1995.

In 1977, Danzig founded Blank Records as a means to distribute music by his newly formed band, The Misfits. However, after only one release, The Misfits' first single "Cough/Cool" (1977), Mercury Records had wanted to use the same name for a sub-label. Danzig traded Mercury the rights to the name for studio time, which The Misfits used to record Static Age. Needing a new name for the label, Danzig decided on Plan 9 Records, a reference to the Ed Wood science fiction film Plan 9 from Outer Space (1957).

The label continued to release material by The Misfits, and later solo efforts by Glenn Danzig and his post-Misfits band Samhain. The only release not to include Danzig was The Victims' Victims EP in 1978.

Starting in 1987, all material was distributed by Caroline Records.

In 1995, due to a legal settlement between Danzig and Misfits bassist Jerry Only, the label was discontinued.

Roster
 The Misfits
 The Victims
 Glenn Danzig (solo efforts)
 Samhain

Discography

See also
 List of record labels

References

Record labels established in 1977
Record labels disestablished in 1995
American independent record labels
Punk record labels
Horror punk record labels
1977 establishments in New Jersey
20th-century disestablishments in New Jersey